Melanephia brunneiventris is a species of moth of the  family Erebidae. It is found in central Madagascar.

References
Berio, E. 1956b. Contribution à l'étude des Noctuidae de Madagascar. - Mémoires de l'Institut scientifique de Madagascar (E) 6:109–140.

Calpinae
Moths described in 1956
Moths of Madagascar